The 2000–01 Kazakhstan Cup was the ninth season of the Kazakhstan Cup, the annual nationwide football cup competition of Kazakhstan since the independence of the country. The competition began on 8 Jule 2000, and ended with the final in June 2001. Kairat were the defending champions, having won their third cup in the 1999-00 competition.

First round

Quarter-finals

Semi-finals

Final

References

2000–01 domestic association football cups
2001 in Kazakhstani football
2000 in Kazakhstani football
Kazakhstan Cup seasons